In typography, a bullet or bullet point, is a typographical symbol or glyph used to introduce items in a list. For example:

Point 1
Point 2
Point 3

The bullet symbol may take any of a variety of shapes, such as circular, square, diamond or arrow. Typical word processor software offers a wide selection of shapes and colors. Historically, the index symbol  (representing a hand with a pointing index finger) was popular for similar uses.

Lists made with bullets are called bulleted lists. The HTML element name for a bulleted list is "unordered list", because the list items are not arranged in numerical order (as they would be in a numbered list).

"Bullet points" 
Items—known as "bullet points"—may be short phrases, single sentences, or of paragraph length. Bulleted items are not usually terminated with a full stop unless they are complete sentences. In some cases, however, the style guide for a given publication may call for every item except the last one in each bulleted list to be terminated with a semicolon, and the last item with a full stop. It is correct to terminate any bullet point with a full stop if the text within that item consists of one full sentence or more. Bullet points are usually used to highlight list elements.

Example of use for a bullet point list
Take for example this arbitrarily chosen statement "Bullets are most often used in technical writing, reference works, notes, and presentations". This statement may be presented using bullets or other techniques:

 Technical writing
 Reference works
 Notes
 Presentations 

Alternatives to bulleted lists are numbered lists and outlines (lettered lists, hierarchical lists). They are used where either the order is important or to label the items for later referencing.

Other uses
The glyph is sometimes used as a way to hide passwords or confidential information.

A variant, the bullet operator is used as a math symbol, akin to the dot operator. Specifically, in logic,  means logical conjunction. It is the same as saying "x and y" (see also List of logic symbols).

Computer usage 
There have been different ways to encode bullet points in computer systems.

In historical systems 
These were not true characters because such points belong to the C0 control codes range; therefore, these glyphs required a special way to be placed on the screen (see code page 437 for discussion).

Prior to the widespread use of word processors, bullets were often denoted by an asterisk; several word processors automatically convert asterisks to bullets if used at the start of line. This notation was inherited by Setext and wiki engines.

In Unicode 
There are a variety of Unicode bullet characters, including:

 
 
 
 
 
  for use in mathematical notation primarily as a dot product instead of interpunct.
 
 
 
 
 ; see Fleuron (typography)
 
 ; see Fleuron (typography)

In web pages 
To create bulleted list items for a web page, the markup language HTML provides the list tag <li>.  Each list tag inside an unordered list will generate one bulleted list item.

In Windows 
When using the US keyboard, a bullet point character can be produced by pressing 7 on the numpad while keeping Alt pressed.

In MacOS 
When using the US keyboard, a bullet point character can be produced by pressing 8 while keeping Option(Alt) pressed.

In LaTeX 
To create bulleted list items for a document, the markup language LaTeX provides the item tag \item .  Each item tag inside an itemized list will generate one bulleted list item.

Wiki markup 
A list item on a wiki page is indicated using one or more leading asterisks in wiki markup as well as in many other wikis.

Other uses in computing 
The bullet is often used for separating menu items, usually in the footer menu. It is common, for example, to see it in latest website designs and in many WordPress themes. It is also used by text editors, like Microsoft Word, to create lists.

References

Further reading 
  Digitized 2007-12-20 by University of Michigan Libraries.

External links 
 

Punctuation
Typographical symbols